Jenzer Motorsport is an auto racing team based in Switzerland. Founded in 1993 by Andreas Jenzer the team is currently competing in FIA Formula 3, Italian F4 and F4 Spanish and has had a number of drivers who would turn out to be successful in motorsport, most notably Formula 1 driver Yuki Tsunoda.

History

In 1993, Jenzer Motorsport was founded by Andreas Jenzer, who was a racing driver and raced in his own team in the German Formula Ford 1800 Championship. While Hans Pfeuti brought the first title for the team in the Swiss Formula Ford 1800 Championship in the same year. The team repeated success in the Swiss championship in 1995, 1996, 1997, 1998 and 2000 with Tazio Pessi, Iradj Alexander, Martin Bünzli, Philipp Mathis, and Walo Schenker respectively. Also the team competed in French, EuroCup and German Formula Ford. Marc Benz won the German Formula Ford Championship title in 2000.

In 2000, Jenzer Motorsport decided to switch to the Formula Renault 2.0 machinery débuting in the French Formula Renault Championship and competed in the other Formula Renault series. Marc Benz, Neel Jani and Michael Ammermüller finished as runner-up in 2001, 2002 and 2005 Eurocup Formula Renault 2.0 seasons. But in the regional series the team was more successful. They clinched title with Ryan Sharp in 2003 in German Formula Renault. In the Italian Formula Renault Championship they won driver titles with Dani Clos in 2006 and Pål Varhaug in 2008. While in the Swiss Formula Renault Championship their titles was achieved by Christopher Zanella in 2008, Nico Müller  in 2009, Zoël Amberg in 2010.

Jenzer Motorsport also raced in the 3.5 Class of Formula Renault since 2003, when Neel Jani finished as runner-up. The team repeated the same result in the next year with Ryan Sharp. But when the V6 Eurocup became Formula Renault 3.5 Series, the team wasn't able to win race and left the series after two seasons. The team moved to International Formula Master in 2007. And in 2009 they won the championship with Fabio Leimer.

After 2009, Jenzer Motorsport left both Formula Renault and International Formula Masters category to join new-for-2010 Formula Abarth and GP3 Series. In the Formula Abarth Italian Series the team collected both drivers' and teams' title with Patric Niederhauser in 2011. While in the GP3 Series, the third place of Nico Müller in 2010 Drivers' Championship still remains the biggest success for the team in the series. After receiving two wins from Patric Niederhauser in the 2012 season, the team endured four years without a win (despite podiums from the likes of Niederhauser, Alex Fontana, Mathéo Tuscher, Ralph Boschung and Arjun Maini) until Maini took victory in the 2017 sprint race at Barcelona.

The team returned to the Formula Renault 2.0 category in 2013, but left again after two seasons, choosing Italian Formula 4 Championship and ADAC Formula 4.

GP3 Series

The team signed for the 2018 season Tatiana Calderón, Juan Manuel Correa and David Beckmann.

FIA Formula 3 Championship
In 2019, Jenzer joined the newly rebranded FIA Formula 3 Championship with Yuki Tsunoda as their first signed driver and Artem Petrov following in February.

Current series results

FIA Formula 3 Championship

* Season still in progress

In detail
(key) (Races in bold indicate pole position) (Races in italics indicate fastest lap)

Italian F4 Championship

Formula Winter Series

Former series results

BOSS GP Series

GP3 Series

In detail 
(key) (Races in bold indicate pole position) (Races in italics indicate fastest lap)

ADAC Formula 4

Spanish F4 Championship

Timeline

Notes

References

External links
 

Swiss auto racing teams
GP3 Series teams
Formula Renault Eurocup teams
Auto racing teams established in 1993
1993 establishments in Switzerland
International Formula Masters teams
FIA Formula 3 Championship teams
World Series Formula V8 3.5 teams